Betty Mae Bolognani (February 23, 1926 – November 1, 2016) is an American politician who served in the Vermont House of Representatives from 2001 to 2003. Four months after incumbent representative Neil Hoag resigned due to medical issues, Governor Howard Dean appointed Bolognani to serve out the remainder of his term. A member of the Democratic Party, Bolognani ran in 2002 and 2004 to represent the Windham-Bennington 1 district in the House but lost both times to Republican Philip Bartlett.

Electoral history

References

External links
 Profile at Vote Smart
 

1926 births
2016 deaths
Democratic Party members of the Vermont House of Representatives
University of Vermont alumni
Women state legislators in Vermont
21st-century American politicians
21st-century American women politicians
Candidates in the 2004 United States elections